Quantum Quality Productions (also known by their initials QQP) was a computer games company specializing in strategy games and war games.

Run by Bruce Williams Zaccagnino and Mark Baldwin it produced a number of games that achieved "cult status", most prominently The Perfect General.

Computer Gaming World reported in March 1994 that QQP was as "a very satisfying wellspring of entertainment", although its "fine games" had "below average documentation". In 1994, due to financial difficulties, QQP accepted a buy-out from American Laser Games. ALG "unceremoniously" closed the studio in December 1995, according to Computer Game Review.

Partial list of games produced by QQP

 Battles in Time
 Battles of Destiny
 Bridge Olympiad
 Conquered Kingdoms
 Dealer's Choice Collection
 Erben des Throns
 Grandest Fleet
 Heirs to the Throne (German import)
 Lucky's Casino Adventure
 Lost Admiral
 Merchant Prince
 Perfect General II
 Perfect General
 Pure Wargame
 Solitaire's Journey
 The Red Crystal: The Seven Secrets of Life
 WWII: Battles of the South Pacific
 Zig Zag

References

External links
Quantum Quality Productions at MobyGames

Video game development companies
Video game publishers
Defunct companies based in New Jersey
1995 disestablishments in New Jersey
Defunct video game companies of the United States